Young People's Party may refer to:

 Young People's Party (Sierra Leone), a political party in Sierra Leone
 Young People's Party (Austria), the youth wing of the Austrian People's Party

See also 
 People's Party (disambiguation)